Swee-Huat Lee was born and raised in Singapore. He graduated from the Sloan Fellowship Program at Stanford University. He was served as an executive at a number of  international enterprises. He is now a professor at National Chengchi University college of commerce, National Tsinghua University, INSEAD EMBA program and Fudan University. His teaching areas include leadership, talent and performance management, as well as organizational development and change management.  He is also a member of the Harvard Business Review Taiwan edition editorial board with a number of columns.

Career

Early career and TSMC 
Swee-Huat Lee has served as an executive at a number of  international enterprises which includes Lucent Technologies, Inc., Polaroid Corporation, General Electric Company, and E. I. du Pont de Nemours and Company.

In 1998, Swee-Huat Lee entered TSMC and was the former vice president of human resources department. He led the transformation of human resources department and also planned a series of training courses for the internal high-level.

Teaching career 
Start from 2002, Swee-Huat Lee began  to teach in National Tsinghua University EMBA. After his retirement in 2004, he refocused his efforts on teaching "Confucianism and leadership" courses in English at National Chengchi University College of Commerce to explore the application of Confucianism. In 2016, he founded Professor of Distinguished Education which elected an outstanding professor every year.

References 

Year of birth missing (living people)
Living people
Singaporean business executives
Academic staff of the National Tsing Hua University
Academic staff of the National Chengchi University
Academic staff of Fudan University